Epipodisma is a genus of spur-throated grasshoppers in the family Acrididae. There is one described species in Epipodisma, E. pedemontana. It is found in Italy, Switzerland, and France.

References

Acrididae